David Landau may refer to:

 David J. Landau (1920–1996), Polish-born Holocaust survivor and author who settled in Australia
 David Landau (screenwriter), American screenwriter
 David Landau (journalist) (1947–2015), editor of Israeli daily newspaper Haaretz
 David Landau (actor) (1879–1935), American film actor of the 1930s
 David P. Landau (born 1941), professor of physics at the University of Georgia
 David E. Landau, American law professor